Henry R. Start (December 28, 1845 – November 7, 1905) was a Vermont lawyer, judge, and politician who served as Speaker of the Vermont House of Representatives and an associate justice of the Vermont Supreme Court.

Biography
Start was born in Bakersfield, Vermont on December 28, 1845, the son of Simeon Gould and Mary Sophia (Barnes) Start. He attended Bakersfield and Barre Academies.  His older brother Charles M. Start served as chief justice of the Minnesota Supreme Court.

He joined the Union Army for the Civil War and served in Company A, 3rd Vermont Volunteers.

Discharged in July 1865, he returned to Franklin County and read law under M. R. Tyler.  He was admitted to the bar in St. Albans in 1867.  Start commenced practice in Bakersfield and formed a partnership, Cross & Start, with A. P. Cross of St. Albans.

A Republican, he served as State's Attorney for Franklin County from 1876 to 1878.

Start served in the Vermont State Senate in 1880 and served on the Judiciary committee and as chairman of the joint standing committee on the reform school.

He was a Trustee of the Vermont Reform School from December 1880 to December 1888.

Start served as a presidential elector in the election of 1888, and cast his ballot for Benjamin Harrison.

In 1890 Start served in the Vermont House of Representatives.  He was elected Speaker, but resigned after being elected an associate justice of the Vermont Supreme Court.

Start served on the court until his death.  He died at his home in Bakersfield on November 7, 1905 and was buried in Bakersfield's Maple Grove Cemetery.  He was succeeded on the Vermont Supreme Court by Willard W. Miles.

Family
He was a Congregationalist.  He married Ellen S. Houghton on June 10, 1869.  Their children included Simeon Gould (b. 1870), Guy H. (b. 1873), Mabel (b. 1878), and Burdette (b. 1885).

References

External links
Henry R. Start at Political Graveyard
Henry R. Start at Vermont in the Civil War

1845 births
1905 deaths
People from Bakersfield, Vermont
American Congregationalists
Republican Party members of the Vermont House of Representatives
Vermont lawyers
State's attorneys in Vermont
Speakers of the Vermont House of Representatives
Republican Party Vermont state senators
Justices of the Vermont Supreme Court
Union Army soldiers
Burials in Vermont
U.S. state supreme court judges admitted to the practice of law by reading law
19th-century American politicians
19th-century American judges